The 1996–97 Albanian National Championship was the 58th season of the Albanian National Championship, the top professional league for association football clubs, since its establishment in 1930.

The championship was interrupted after 17th round due to the economic-political crisis in Albania in 1997 and was completed in August. Instead the regular second half, the final play-off phase was played, with the 18 teams were divided into 3 groups of 6 according to standings after the 17 rounds.

Teams

Stadia and last season

Regular season

League table

Results

Final phase

Group 1
Played in Tirana.

Results

Group 2
Played in Kavajë and Durrës.

Results

Group 3
Played in Elbasan.

Results

Season statistics

Top scorers

Notes

References

Albania - List of final tables (RSSSF)

Kategoria Superiore seasons
1
Albanian Superliga